Krunić is a Serbo-Croatian surname. Notable people with the surname include:

Aleksandra Krunić (born 1993), Serbian tennis player
Boško Krunić (1929 – 2017), Yugoslavian Communist political figure
Branislav Krunić (born 1979), former Bosnian Serb football player
Predrag Krunić (born 1967), Bosnia and Herzegovina professional basketball coach
Rade Krunić (born 1993), Bosnian footballer
Simo Krunić (born 1967), Serbian football manager and former player
Uroš Krunić (born 1994), Serbian footballer

Bosnian surnames
Serbian surnames
Patronymic surnames